Antimony telluride is an inorganic compound with the chemical formula Sb2Te3. As is true of other pnictogen chalcogenide layered materials, it is a grey crystalline solid with layered structure. Layers consist of two atomic sheets of antimony and three atomic sheets of tellurium and are held together by weak van der Waals forces. Sb2Te3 is a narrow-gap semiconductor with a band gap 0.21 eV; it is also a topological insulator, and thus exhibits thickness-dependent physical properties.

Crystalline structure
Sb2Te3 has a rhombohedral crystalline structure. The crystalline material comprises atoms covalently bonded to form 5 atom thick sheets (in order: Te-Sb-Te-Sb-Te), with sheets held together by van der Waals attraction. Due to its layered structure and weak inter-layer forces, bulk antimony telluride may be mechanically exfoliated to isolate single sheets.

Synthesis
Although antimony telluride is a naturally occurring compound, select stoichiometric compounds may be formed by the reaction of antimony with tellurium at 500–900 °C.

2 Sb(l) + 3 Te(l) → Sb2Te3(l)

Applications
Like other binary chalcogenides of antimony and bismuth, Sb2Te3 has been investigated for its semiconductor properties.  It can be transformed into both n-type and p-type semiconductors by doping with an appropriate dopant.

Doping Sb2Te3 with iron introduces multiple Fermi pockets, in contrast to the single frequency detected for pure Sb2Te3, and results in reduced carrier density and mobility.

Sb2Te3 forms the pseudobinary intermetallic system germanium-antimony-tellurium with germanium telluride, GeTe.

Like bismuth telluride, Bi2Te3, antimony telluride has a large thermoelectric effect and is therefore used in solid state refrigerators.

References

Antimony(III) compounds
Tellurides